V.V.Subrahmanyam, commonly known as VVS (born 1944), is an Indian violist, composer, and academic. Regarded as one of the best violinist in carnatic music.

Early life
VVS was born as Vadakkencheri Veeraraghava Subrahmanyam in 1944 in Ernakulam, Kerala.

VVS received his early education from his father. He received further training from Carnatic music violinists such as Tripunithura Narayana Iyer, Chembai, Musiri Subramania Iyer, and Semmangudi Srinivasa Iyer.

Career
In 1966, VVS performed on the violin at the United Nations General Assembly with T. K. Murthy and M. S. Subbulakshmi.
   
Between 1978 and 1982, VVS was a professor of violin at the Tamil Nadu Government Music College. He has also taught at Wesleyan University in the United States and some universities in Europe.

In 1993, he was awarded with Kalaimamani given by the Tamil Nadu Eyal lsai Nataka Manram.

In 1988, he received the Kerala Sangeetha Nataka Akademi Award and in 2005, he received the Sangeet Natak Akademi Award.

Awards and recognition
 Sangeet Natak Akademi Award (2005)
 Kalaimamani (1993)
 Kerala Sangeetha Nataka Akademi Award (1988)

References

1944 births
Living people
Wesleyan University faculty
People from Kochi
Recipients of the Kalaimamani Award
Recipients of the Sangeet Natak Akademi Award
Recipients of the Kerala Sangeetha Nataka Akademi Award